Pa Modou Kah (born 30 July 1980) is a Norwegian football coach and former footballer who currently serves as an assistant coach with Charlotte FC of Major League Soccer.

Club career

Vålerenga
Born in Banjul, The Gambia, Kah and his family emigrated to Norway in 1988, when he was eight years old. He began his football career with Vålerenga in 1998. At Vålerenga, Kah appeared in 94 league matches and scored 9 goals. In the 2001 season, his side won promotion and won the Norwegian Cup the year after.

AIK
In the mid-2003, he moved to Swedish club AIK as a part of the club's efforts for winning the championship. Kah was appreciated for his fighting spirit and ability to win the ball. Although his natural position was as a central midfielder, he had to play in various positions; he played several games at right-back. After the club was relegated the following season, Kah transferred to Dutch club Roda JC, making nearly 200 league appearances. In the Netherlands Kah mainly played as central defender.

Al-Khor

In 2011, after seven years in the Netherlands, Kah moved to Qatari club Al Khor.

Portland Timbers
After a brief period in Saudi Arabia with Al-Wehda, Kah moved to the United States on 3 May 2013 when he signed with Major League Soccer club Portland Timbers. On 8 December 2014, the Portland Timbers declined contract options on Kah.

Vancouver Whitecaps FC
He was unsigned in the waivers draft and later claimed by Vancouver Whitecaps FC on 21 January 2015.

In August 2016, he agreed to mutually terminate his contract with Vancouver Whitecaps' first team in favour of joining their USL team as a player-coach. On 21 February 2017 Kah announced his retirement and it was also confirmed, that he would continue working at the club as a Whitecaps FC staff coach.

Coaching career
FC Cincinnati added Kah to its technical staff as a member of the scouting staff in August 2018. In January 2019, the club announced that Kah's role would be changing, and he would now serve as an assistant coach.

On 14 January 2020, Kah signed with Canadian Premier League side Pacific FC as the club's new head coach. During the 2020 CPL season, Kah guided Pacific to their first play-off appearance, when they reached the second group stage of the Island Games before being eliminated. During the 2021 season, Kah guided Pacific to the 2021 Canadian Championship semi-finals, defeating Vancouver Whitecaps FC and Cavalry FC before falling to Toronto FC. In the 2021 Canadian Premier League Final, Pacific defeated Forge FC 1-0 at Tim Hortons Field. For his efforts, Kah would be named the 2021 CPL Coach of the Year.

On 21 January 2022, Kah was announced as the new head coach of North Texas SC.

In January 2023, he joined Major League Soccer club Charlotte FC as an assistant coach.

Managerial statistics

Personal life
In 2005, he was involved in a car accident in Peer, Belgium. He was accompanied by his girlfriend, his cousin, and a friend. His car was rear-ended while stopped at a routine road check, immediately killing his girlfriend but only inflicting minor injuries to Kah. In Roda JC's next match, referee Bjorn Kuipers held a minute of silence to in honour of Kah's girlfriend. During the game, Arouna Koné took his shirt off to reveal an undershirt which bore the inscription "For Kah". The referee showed Koné a yellow card, a decision the commentators criticized. Kuipers said afterwards that he had not seen the text on Koné's shirt.

Kah speaks seven languages, including English, Norwegian, and some Spanish.

Kah possesses a US green card which qualifies him as a domestic player for MLS roster purposes.

Kah is the nephew of Djimon Hounsou.

Honours

Manager
Pacific FC
Canadian Premier League: 2021

References

External links

1980 births
Living people
People from Banjul
Gambian emigrants to Norway
Norwegian footballers
Norway international footballers
AIK Fotboll players
Vålerenga Fotball players
Roda JC Kerkrade players
Qatar SC players
Al-Wehda Club (Mecca) players
Portland Timbers players
Vancouver Whitecaps FC players
Whitecaps FC 2 players
Eredivisie players
Eliteserien players
Allsvenskan players
Qatar Stars League players
Major League Soccer players
USL Championship players
Norwegian expatriate footballers
Expatriate footballers in Sweden
Norwegian expatriate sportspeople in Sweden
Expatriate footballers in the Netherlands
Norwegian expatriate sportspeople in the Netherlands
Expatriate footballers in Qatar
Expatriate footballers in Saudi Arabia
Norwegian expatriate sportspeople in Qatar
Norwegian expatriate sportspeople in Saudi Arabia
Expatriate soccer players in the United States
Norwegian expatriate sportspeople in the United States
Expatriate soccer players in Canada
Norwegian expatriate sportspeople in Canada
Norwegian expatriate football managers
Association football defenders
Saudi Professional League players
Naturalised citizens of Norway
Norwegian people of Gambian descent
FC Cincinnati non-playing staff
Pacific FC non-playing staff
Canadian Premier League coaches